Annetta Pelucchi was a dancer with the Chicago Opera Company.

Early life 
Pelucchi was born in Italy, the daughter of an Italian army officer. Her mother was French. She studied dance in Milan.

Career 
Pelucchi danced with the Opéra-Comique in Paris. She moved to the United States and became premiere danseuse with the Chicago Opera Ballet in 1917. She danced in operas of the 1917–1918 season, including Les Huguenots starring Myrna Sharlow and Rosa Raisa, The Jewels of the Madonna starring Giulio Crimi, Azora starring Anna Fitziu, Louise starring Genevieve Vix, and Lakmé and La traviata, both starring Amelita Galli-Curci.

Personal life 
Pelucchi married Massachusetts legislator and writer Arthur Franklyn Blanchard in 1918.

References

External links 
 "Chicago Opera Ballet: Ambrosini and Annetta +Pelucchi", a news photograph in the George Grantham Bain Collection, Library of Congress.
A photograph of Annetta Pelucchi, from a French publication, held in the Archives de la Monnaie.
A photograph of Annetta Pelucchi in Japanese costume, held in the Archives de la Monnaie.

20th-century Italian dancers